Metapenaeus monoceros is a species of prawn in the family Penaeidae. It is also known as speckled shrimp, brown shrimp and pink shrimp in English,  in French,  in Spanish, koraney chingri or honye chingri in India, ginger prawn in South Africa and choodan chemmeen in Malayalam.

Distribution and ecology
Metapenaeus monoceros is native to the Indo-West Pacific from Durban to the Red Sea along the African coast and around India. Now it has also invaded into the eastern Mediterranean Sea through the Suez Canal, eliminating population of the native species Melicertus kerathurus in those areas.

They prefer sandy or sandy mud bottoms. They live in brackish water or marine ecosystem.

Description
Adult M. monoceros are pale grey with dark brown spots giving them the name brown shrimp or speckled shrimp. Their body is covered with short hairs. They have red–orange antennae. Males have a prominent curved spine on fifth pereiopod (walking leg).

Reproduction
Metapenaeus monoceros is believed to be a continuous breeder with two major spawning seasons. These seasons were found to vary with time and location and environmental factors. In Tunisia, spawning seasons are May–June and October–November. In Egypt, May and July–October were found to be the spawning seasons. In Turkey spawning occurred between November and January. In India, December–April and August–September are the two main spawning seasons.

Commercial importance
Metapenaeus monoceros is of commercial importance throughout its range. It is important in African coastal countries, India, Pakistan, Bangladesh, Turkey, Israel and Egypt.

References

Penaeidae
Edible crustaceans
Commercial crustaceans
Crustaceans described in 1798